Kasdan is a surname. Notable people with the surname include:

Jake Kasdan (born 1974), American actor, film director, and screenwriter
Jon Kasdan (born 1979), American actor and film director
Lawrence Kasdan (born 1949), American film director, producer, and screenwriter

See also
 
 Kazhdan

Jewish surnames